Max Quanchi is an Australian academic whose research specialisations have been the South Pacific nations and the role of photography in recording and transmitting its cultures and histories.

Biography 
Quanchi was born in Victoria on 20 June 1945, third and youngest son to parents Grace and Harry, who moved the family through a series of country towns. He completed High School at Wonthaggi, in South Gippsland. He qualified as a primary teacher and taught a year in a one-teacher remote rural school. Conscripted into National Service, he spent 1966‐1967 in Wewak, Papua New Guinea in the 2PIR Moem Barracks. His five “Nasho Chalkie” (National servicemen/teacher) companions remained close friends and collaborated later on a memoir. Moem Barracks were significant in housing a battalion newly recruited in PNG’s expansion of its army during preparations for self-government and independence.

Education 
Quanchi undertook an Honours and MA degree in History at Monash University and subsequently lecturing at universities in Melbourne, Brisbane, Suva in Fiji, and at the University of Papua New Guinea. For his PhD he researched the history of photography in PNG.

Research 
Quanchi embarked on research into the history of Gippsland in the early 1980s, publishing books on the subject, but by 1983 had turned his attention to the Pacific region. He has visited PNG regularly over more than forty years to conduct History Teacher workshops, and was a Guest Speaker for P&O Cruises. He concentrated his academic research to focus on Pacific Islands history and the history of photography. Since 1996 he has convened sessions on photography at Pacific History Association conferences, and for AAAPS (Association for the Advancement of Pacific Studies in Australia, now AAPS) for which he was its first secretary.

Quanchi has written and published frequently in his specialised field of research, notably his 2007 monograph Photographing Papua: Representation, Colonial Encounters and Imaging in the Public Domain focused on the colonial frontier in Papua New Guinea.  His contribution of articles on photography appear in The Oxford Companion to the Photograph (2005), Berg Encyclopaedia of Fashion and Dress (2009), Coast to Coast (2010) and in the journals History of Photography, History Focus, Pacific Arts, Journal of Pacific Studies, Agora, Australian Historical Studies, Journal of Australian Studies and Journal of Pacific History. He is on the editorial board  of the latter and also of the Journal of New Zealand and Pacific Studies, for which he has been guest editor for special issues of several.

Reception 
Miriam Kahn of the University of Washington in her review of Quanchi's Postcards from Oceania as "accessible," and "a clear and concise text that is highly descriptive in nature," noting that "There is a wealth of scholarly literature about Oceania and colonialism but very little exists that focuses specifically on postcards and their important link to colonialism," though in a separate review, noting Quanchi and Shekleton's extensive bibliography on the subject, Jacqueline Leckie indicates that Quanchi has been in the vanguard of what is now a "a shift within Pacific history towards centring the visual (including postcards) as a valuable and insightful source."

Carol E. Mayer of the University of British Columbia in reviewing his major work Photographing Papua: representation, colonial encounters and imaging in the public domain introduces as an
"idea fundamental to his work; that late-19th and early-20th century photography in the area known as Papua was the product of the convergence of three phenomena: new technology (the camera), new science (anthropology) and the arrival of an entourage of Europeans (missionaries, traders, government officials, travellers). Quanchi's theoretical underpinnings are dispersed in origin, and he admits to assembling his analysis from a range of academic methodologies and approaches. It can certainly be argued that, historically, anthropology as a discipline paid little attention to the value of photography as an analytical tool."

Mitchell Rolls in Travelling Home, Walkabout Magazine and Mid-Twentieth-Century Australia frequently cites as valuable Quanchi's prior research into articles on, and images of, Papua New Guinea in Walkabout, though contesting Quanchi's assertion that "Walkabout with its heavily illustrated, topical, mass circulation was read by many Australians, who often ignored the text and merely passed the time skipping through the photographs".

Contributions in education 
From 1995‐2001 Quanchi devised and presented a regional Professional Development Program for teachers (TTPF),  and over 2011‐2015 led the Moana Project, a regional research network.  He introduced and taught the first BA degree course on “Australia and the Pacific” at QUT from 1990 to 2009.

Public speaking 
Quanchi has contributed to discussions on ABC radio and as an expert consultant; appeared in video presentations; presented at museums; has been a speaker at the Sydney Ideas Festival in 2014;  on WWI Memorials in the Pacific at the University of the South Pacific/French Embassy symposia in 2015; and as a commentator and reviewer.

He is now retired and lives in Brisbane.

Books

Book chapters 

 Quanchi, Max (2019). Melanesia: A region and a history. In 
 Quanchi, Max (2017). Tropicalisation and representation in Oceania: or a path into the deep, dark jungle. In 
 Quanchi, Max (2016). Nauru. In 
 Quanchi, Max (2015). Thomas McMahon's Pacific neighbours; an early Australian photojournalist. In 
 Quanchi, Max (2014). Geschichte der fotografie der Pazifischen Inseln. In 
 Quanchi, Max (2011). Towards a single visual history of New Zealand, In 
 Quanchi, Max (2010). Merl La Voy: an American photographer in the South Seas. In 
 Quanchi, Max (2010). Photographic Representations of Pacific Peoples. In 
 Quanchi, Max (2010). ‘It’s Our Turn to Give Orders’. Walkabout’s View of a Nation in the Making. In 
 Cochrane, Susan and Quanchi, Max (2007). Hunting the collectors. In

Journal articles 

 
 Quanchi, Max (2020). Review of 'Tulagi: Pacific Outpost of British Empire' by Clive Moore. Journal of New Zealand & Pacific Studies, 8 (1), 127-129. doi: 10.1386/nzps_00027_5
 
 Quanchi, Max (2017). Review of No. 1 Neighbour; Art in Papua New Guinea 1966-2016. Journal of Pacific History, 52 (4), 530-532.
 Quanchi, Max (2016). Review of 'The Pacific War: aftermath, remembrance and culture' Edited by Christina Twomey and Ernest Koh. Journal of New Zealand and Pacific Studies, 4 (1), 95-97.
 Quanchi, Max (2016). Review of 'Pacific futures: projects politics and interests' Edited by Will Rollason. Journal of New Zealand and Pacific Studies, 4 (1), 95-97.
 
 Quanchi, Max (2016). Review of 'World War I, Fiji and Ratu Sukuna: an exhibition' curated by Larry Thomas. The Journal of Pacific History, 51 (1), 55-56.
 
 
 Quanchi, Max (2015). Review of 'Diminishing conflicts in Asia and the Pacific: why some subside and others don’t' Edited by Edward Aspinall, Robin Jeffrey and Anthony J. Regan. Journal of New Zealand and Pacific Studies, 3 (2), 221-223. doi: 10.1386/nzps.3.2.207_5
 
 Quanchi, Max (2014). Review of 'The echo of things: the lives of photographs in the Solomon Islands' by Christopher Wright. CAA Reviews, 1-3.
 
 </ref>
 Quanchi, Max (2014). Kanaka portraits: Indentured labour in Colonial Australia. Pacific Arts, 13 (2), 33-44.
 
 Quanchi, Max (2013). Review of 'Light on Darkness? Missionary Photography of Africa in the Nineteenth and Early Twentieth Centuries' by T. Jack Thompson. American Historical Review, 118 (3), 976-977. doi: 10.1093/ahr/118.3.976
 Quanchi, Max (2013). Australia (not) in the Pacific. Agora, 48 (2), 28-35.
 Quanchi, Max (2013). Review of Oceania under Steam: sea transport and the cultures of colonialism c 1870-1914 by Francis Steel. South Pacific Journal of Philosophy and Culture, 11 (2010-2012), 67-68.
 Quanchi, Max (2012). Review of 'Drua: the wave of fire' Co-directed by Vilsoni Hereniko, Peter Rockford Espiritu and Igelese Ete. Journal of Pacific History, 47 (4), 519-521. doi: 10.1080/00223344.2012.730033
 
 
 
 Quanchi, Max (2010). Old and new histories. Agora, 45 (4), 76-81.
 Quanchi, Max (2010). The Pacific by Donald B. Freeman. The Journal of Pacific History, 45 (1), 160-161. doi: 10.1080/00223344.2010.484185
 
 
 Quanchi, Max (2006). The imaging of Samoa in illustrated magazines and serial encyclopedias in the early 20th-century. Journal of Pacific History, 41 (2), 207-217. doi: 10.1080/00223340600826110
 
 Quanchi, Max (2006). Visual histories and photographic evidence. Journal Of Pacific History, 41 (2), 165-173. doi: 10.1080/00223340600826052
 Quanchi, Max and Moore, Clive (2002). (Book Review)'Refined White', Queensland Museum, Brisbane, 2001-2002. Journal of Pacific History, 37 (1), 124-126.
 Quanchi, M and Moore, C (2002). (Book Review) 'Embarquement pour le Queensland, Des Loyaltiens en terre australienne', Museum of tropical Queensland, Townsville, Bibliotheque Bernheim, Noumea and Musee d'Easo, Lifou, Loyalty Islands. Journal of Pacific History, 37 (1), 124-126.

References 

1945 births
Historians of photography
Historians of the Pacific
Historians of Oceania
Australian academics
History of Melanesia
Living people
Australian art historians
20th-century Australian historians
21st-century Australian historians
Melanesian culture